Falden may refer to:

Faldstool
Falden, Denmark, a village in Funen